Manuel Carrasco Alonso (27 January 1894 – Unknown) was a Spanish footballer who played as a defender and who competed in the 1920 Summer Olympics.

Club career
Born in Irun, Carrasco began playing football at his hometown club Racing de Irún in 1912, and he played a pivotal role in helping the club win the 1913 Copa del Rey, defeating Athletic Bilbao in the final. In 1915, Racing de Irún merged with Sporting de Irún to form Real Unión Club de Irún and along with other Racing players, Carrasco joined this newly created club that would become one of the dominant teams in Basque and Spain during the following decade, winning another Copa del Rey title after beating Madrid FC

International career
Being a Real Unión player, he was eligible to play for the 'North' / Basque Country representative team, being a member of the team that won the first edition of the Prince of Asturias Cup in 1915, an inter-regional competition organized by the RFEF. With the Basque side he formed a great defensive partnership with Athletic's Luis Hurtado, which only conceded one goal in the whole tournament, and that was to Santiago Bernabéu in a 1–1 draw with a Castille/Madrid XI, a draw that was enough for the Basques to win the cup for the first time.

Carrasco was a member of the Spanish squad that competed in the 1920 Summer Olympics, but he failed to feature in a single game as Spain won silver after beating the Netherlands 3–1 in the decisive game.

Honours

Club
Real Unión
North Regional Championship:
Winners (1) 1917–18
Copa del Rey:
Winners (2) 1913 and 1918

International
Spain
Summer Olympics:
Silver medal (1): 1920

Basque Country XI
Prince of Asturias Cup:
Champions (1):1915

References

1894 births
1935 deaths
Spanish footballers
Spain international footballers
Footballers at the 1920 Summer Olympics
Olympic footballers of Spain
Olympic silver medalists for Spain
Footballers from the Basque Country (autonomous community)
Sportspeople from Irun
Olympic medalists in football
Medalists at the 1920 Summer Olympics
Association football defenders
Basque Country international footballers
Real Unión footballers
Real Sociedad footballers